Gibbovalva tricuneatella is a moth of the family Gracillariidae. It is known from the states of New South Wales and Queensland in Australia and the Ryukyu Islands of Japan.

The larvae feed on Typha angustifolia, Typha domingensis and Typha latifolia. They mine the leaves of their host plant. The mine has the form of an elongate blotch mine.

References

Acrocercopinae
Moths of Japan
Moths described in 1880